Kafil Uddin Sonar (1943/1944 – 25 October 2019) was a Bangladeshi politician belonging to Jatiya Party. He was elected as an MP of Jatiya Sangsad from Naogaon-4 in 1988. He died on 25 October 2019 at the age of 75.

References

1940s births
2019 deaths
Jatiya Party politicians
People from Naogaon District
4th Jatiya Sangsad members